The participation of Slovenia in Eurovision Choir began in Riga, Latvia, at the Eurovision Choir of the Year 2017. Radiotelevizija Slovenija (RTVSLO) a member organisation of the European Broadcasting Union (EBU) are responsible for the selection process of their participants, for their debut in 2017. The first representative to participate for the nation at the 2017 edition were the Carmen Manet choir who won the contest with their medley of Ta na Solbici, Adrca, Aj, zelena je vsa gora.

Origins of the event 
The Eurovision Choir of the Year is a new event being launched by the EBU, and the latest event to be launched since the Eurovision Magic Circus Show. The event will consist of non-professional choirs who are members of the EBU, with the inaugural contest scheduled to take place on 22 July 2017, hosted by the Latvian broadcaster Latvijas Televīzija (LTV), and to coincide with the closing ceremony of the European Choir Games 2017. The event will be officially confirmed on 30 November 2016 depending on a reasonable amount of interest from active members of the European Broadcasting Union.

History
On 27 February 2017, the Slovenian national broadcaster, Radiotelevizija Slovenija (RTVSlo), announced that they would be making their Choir of the Year debut at the 2017 edition in Riga, Latvia on 22 July 2017. They became the first ever winners in the first edition in 2017.

Participation overview 
Table key

Broadcasts

Commentators
The contests are broadcast online worldwide through the official Eurovision Choir of the Year website eurovisionchoir.tv and YouTube. The Slovenian broadcaster, RTVSlo, will send their own commentator to each contest in order to provide commentary in Slovene.

See also
Slovenia in the Eurovision Song Contest – Senior version of the Junior Eurovision Song Contest.
Slovenia in the Eurovision Young Dancers – A competition organised by the EBU for younger dancers aged between 16 and 21.
Slovenia in the Eurovision Young Musicians – A competition organised by the EBU for musicians aged 18 years and younger.
Slovenia in the Junior Eurovision Song Contest – Singing contest for children aged between 9 and 14.

References

External links
 

Slovenia
Slovenian music